William MacPherson Ross (29 July 1900 – 14 June 1992) was a Canadian rower, born in Acton, Ontario, who competed in the 1928 Summer Olympics. In 1928 he won the bronze medal as member of the Canadian boat in the eights competition. He also competed in the 1930 British Empire Games.

References

External links
 

1900 births
1992 deaths
People from Halton Hills
Canadian male rowers
Olympic rowers of Canada
Rowers at the 1928 Summer Olympics
Olympic bronze medalists for Canada
Olympic medalists in rowing
Medalists at the 1928 Summer Olympics
Rowers at the 1930 British Empire Games
Commonwealth Games competitors for Canada